Koottinilamkili is a 1984 Indian Malayalam film, directed by Sajan and produced by P. T. Xavier. The film stars Sukumari, Mammootty, Adoor Bhasi and Maniyanpilla Raju in the lead roles. The film has musical score by Shyam.

Plot 
Krishnanunni comes from an oppressed low caste; he studies and becomes an IAS Officer. Radhika is the daughter of Valiyakurup from a high caste, and she works as a stenographer for Krishnanunni. They both are from the same village and Krishnanunni liked her, but wasn't able to marry her due to caste restrictions that othered and ostracised him. Krishnanunni has to deal with corrupt politicians and officials in his daily work life. One such corrupt politician knows about Krishnanunni's past love story with Radhika. When he sees that Krishnanunni is not bending the laws and policies for him, he uses the love story for character assassination. The story further explores how Krishnanunni's and Radhika's life is affected after these related events.

Cast
Mammootty as Krishnanunni
Sukumari as Sharadamma
Adoor Bhasi as Valiyakurup
Maniyanpilla Raju as Gopan
Menaka as Radhika
Unnimary as Mallika 
Kuchan(actor) as Narayana bhatt
Baby Shalini as Nandinikutty
Jose Prakash as Raman Nair
Balan K. Nair as Yousuf Ikka
Lalu Alex as Vikraman
Prathapachandran as Menon
Thilakan as Devasya
Lalitha Sree as Parvathy
M. G. Soman as Balachandran
Innocent as clerk
Mala Aravindan as Govinda Pilla
Thodupuzha Vasanthy as clerk
Cochin Haneefa as roommate 
Thodupuzha Radhakrishnan as news reporter

Soundtrack
The music was composed by Shyam and the lyrics were written by Chunakkara Ramankutty.

References

External links
 

1984 films
1980s Malayalam-language films
Films directed by Sajan